The Winterstock is a mountain of the Urner Alps, located west of Realp in the canton of Uri. It lies on the range east of the Tiefenstock, that separates the Göschenertal from the valley called Urseren.

References

External links
 Winterstock on Hikr

Mountains of the Alps
Alpine three-thousanders
Mountains of the canton of Uri
Mountains of Switzerland